Andrew Clark may refer to:

Sportsmen
Andy Clark (footballer) (1879–1940), Scottish football/soccer player
Andrew Clark (soccer) (born 1974), Australian football/soccer player
Andrew Clark (ice hockey) (born 1988), Canadian ice hockey player

Others
Sir Andrew Clark, 1st Baronet (1826–1893), British physician
Sir Andrew Clark, 3rd Baronet (1898–1979), British barrister
Andrew Clark (priest) (1856–1922), Scottish Anglican clergyman and diarist
Andrew G. Clark (born 1954), American population geneticist
Andrew Inglis Clark (1848–1907), Australian politician
Andy Clark (born 1957), British philosopher
Andy Clark (musician), English musical artist
Andy Clark (Clark Hutchinson), English musical artist with the band Upp

See also
Andrew Clarke (disambiguation)